The Cook Islands Rugby League Association are the governing body for rugby league in Cook Islands. They are based in the capital Apia, the League has suffered financially due to member leagues not paying affiliation fees.

History
They were founded in 1949 and have been members of the Rugby League International Federation since 1974.

Along with the governing bodies of Tonga, Samoa, Fiji and the Cook Islands, they founded the Asia-Pacific Rugby League Confederation in December 2009.

See also

Rugby league in the Cook Islands
Cook Islands national rugby league team

References

External links

Rugby league in the Cook Islands
Rugby league governing bodies in Oceania
Sports organizations established in 1949
Rugby L